A general election was held in the Northern Territory on Saturday 4 June 1994, and was won by the incumbent Country Liberal Party (CLP). Marshall Perron continued as Chief Minister.

Independent Noel Padgham-Purich retained her seat of Nelson while Independent Denis Collins lost his seat of Greatorex to the CLP.

Retiring MPs

Country Liberal
Nick Dondas MLA (Casuarina)
Roger Vale MLA (Braitling)

Results 

|}

Candidates

Sitting members are listed in bold. Successful candidates are highlighted in the relevant colour.

Seats changing hands

Post-election pendulum 
The following pendulum is known as the Mackerras pendulum, invented by psephologist Malcolm Mackerras.  The pendulum works by lining up all of the seats held in the Legislative Assembly according to the percentage point margin they are held by on a two-party-preferred basis. This is also known as the swing required for the seat to change hands. Given a uniform swing to the opposition or government parties, the number of seats that change hands can be predicted.

References

Elections in the Northern Territory
1994 elections in Australia
1990s in the Northern Territory
June 1994 events in Australia